The Miller Group Advertising, Inc. is a digital advertising and marketing agency in Los Angeles. It was founded in 1990 by Renee Miller, the agency's president and creative director. The Miller Group is headquartered in Los Angeles, California.  The agency has won many creative awards over the years and has worked on a number of national brands, including Kenwood Electronics, Goodwill, RE/MAX, General Electric and Anthem. More recently, the agency has worked with simple human, PSAV, Health Strategies Group, and Centra Credit Union.

History
Marketing specialist Renee Miller founded The Miller Group Advertising, Inc. in 1990. By 2004, Gary M. Bettman, enjoying a professional background in the movie industry, joined The Miller Group. As a producer of feature films, he worked with stars like Billy Bob Thornton, Lorenzo Lamas and Mark Cuban. In 2007, the agency expanded its presence to Dallas and New York.

Capabilities
The agency specializes in Brand Revitalization, Video Production, Strategy, Research, Digital, Creative, Media, Social Media, New Product Launches and Lead Generation.  

On top of the day-to-day business, the agency's executives offer seminars, judge creative work and give interviews to industry relevant magazines.

Awards and achievements
Over the years The Miller Group Advertising, Inc. has received many awards and recognitions:
 Consumer Magazine 2nd Place Color Page for the client Wolf Range
 One Show Award Silver for Consumer Magazine Color less than a Page  for the client Wolf Range
 One Show Award Finalist for Consumer Magazine Black and White One Page for the client Gay Men's Chorus of Los Angeles
 The New York Festivals Silver Award for Newspaper Advertising for the client Woman to Woman Medical Center

Literature
 Advertising Club of Los Angeles: The 30th Annual Belding Awards, 1995, p. 98.
 Communication Arts: Advertising Annual 41, Volume 42, Number 7, Menlo Park 2000, p. 166, .
 Communication Arts: Design Annual 50, Volume 51, Number 5, Menlo Park 2009, p. 157, .
 Michael R. Solomon: Consumer Behavior - Buying, Having, and Being, 7th ed.,  Pearson, Upper Saddle River 2006, p. 98, .
 The New York Festivals - The World's Best Work:  International Print, Radio & Television Advertising Awards, Annual2, The New Yorks Festival, New York 1993, p. 249, .
 The One Show:  Judged to be Advertising's best Print, Radio, TV, Volume 16, RotoVision S.A., Mies 1994, p. 250, .
 The One Show:  Judged to be Advertising's best Print, Radio, TV, Volume 18, RotoVision S.A., Crans-Pres-Celigny 1996, p. 28, .

References

External links
 Adweek: Teddi Tests the Waters With Miller Group's B2B Ads
 Adweek: Miller Group branding Centinela
 Adweek: New Campaigns
 Wolf Ranges, No place like home

Advertising agencies of the United States
Companies based in Los Angeles